Das Beste aus… Gottes Beitrag und Teufels Werk (ger. "The Best of… God's Contribution and [the] Devil's Work") is the fourth album of the German group E Nomine. It is a greatest hits album. The title is possibly a play on "Gottes Werk und Teufels Beitrag", the German title of John Irving's The Cider House Rules.

Track listing

Normal CD 
"Gottes Beitrag und Teufels Werk" [God's Contribution and [the] Devil's Work]
"Vater Unser" [Our Father]
"Mitternacht" [Midnight]
"Nebelpfade" [Paths of Fog]
"Das Omen (im Kreis des Bösen)" [The Omen (in the Circle of Evil)]
"Der Ring der Nibelungen" [The Ring of the Nibelungs]
"Das Tier in mir (Wolfen)" [The Beast in me (Wolves)]
"Nachtwache (Blaubeermund)" [Vigil (Blueberry-Mouth)]
"Die Runen von Asgard" [The Runes of Asgard]
"Schwarze Sonne" [Black Sun]
"Opus Magnum" [Great Work]
"Laetitia" [Happiness]
"Die Schwarzen Reiter" [The Black Riders]
"E Nomine (Denn sie wissen nicht was sie tun)" [E Nomine (For they know not what they do)]
"Das Böse" [The Evil]
"Deine Welt" [Your World]
"Spiegelbilder" [Mirror Images]
"Bibelworte des Allmächtigen" [Bible words of the Almighty]
"Der Turm" [The Tower]
"Vater Unser, Pt. 2 (Psalm 23)" [Our Father, Part II (Psalm 23)]

Limited edition 
A limited edition was also released with a second disc.

CD1
"Gottes Beitrag und Teufels Werk"
"Vater Unser"
"Mitternacht"
"Nebelpfade"
"Das Omen (im Kreis des Bösen)"
"Der Ring der Nibelungen"
"Das Tier in mir (Wolfen)"
"Nachtwache (Blaubeermund)"
"Die Runen von Asgard"
"Schwarze Sonne"
"Opus Magnum"
"Laetitia"
"Die Schwarzen Reiter"
"E Nomine (Denn sie wissen nicht was sie tun)"
"Das Böse"
"Deine Welt"
"Spiegelbilder"
"Bibelworte des Allmächtigen"
"Der Turm"
"Vater Unser, Pt. 2 (Psalm 23)"

CD2
"Drachengold" [Dragon Gold]
"E Nomine... Der Hitmix"
"Klassik Medley" (includes Morgane le Fay, Mondengel, Der Befehl des König Herodes, Laetitia, Spiegelbilder, Friedenshymne, Anderwelt (Laterna Magica), Das Rad des Schicksals, Espiritu del aire, Blaubeermund, Ein neuer Tag)
"Deine Welt (Orchester Version)"
"Christ Kind kommt bald! (Hidden Track within Deine Welt (Orchester Version))
"Schwarze Sonne (Multimedia Track)"
"Schwarze Sonne (Making of Video)"

E Nomine albums
2004 greatest hits albums